Günther Schorsten (April 12, 1916 – May 20, 1974) was a Romanian field handball player of German origin who competed in the 1936 Summer Olympics. He was part of the Romanian field handball team, which finished fifth in the Olympic tournament. He played two matches.

References
Günther Schorsten's profile at Sports Reference.com

1916 births
1974 deaths
Field handball players at the 1936 Summer Olympics
Olympic handball players of Romania
Romanian male handball players